The First City Building was built in 1962 for the First Security National Bank. The five story building was built by renowned architect L.W. Pitts and built in the modernism style. It is known for its facade of cast concrete, sculpted by Beaumont artist Herring Coe, designed to reflect the sun and reduce cooling costs. The building is used as offices today.

Photo gallery

See also

National Register of Historic Places listings in Jefferson County, Texas

References

External links

Historic district contributing properties in Texas
Buildings and structures in Beaumont, Texas
National Register of Historic Places in Jefferson County, Texas